Protentomon is a genus of proturans in the family Protentomidae.

Species
 Protentomon acrasia (Vidal Sarmiento & Najt, 1971)
 Protentomon atlanteum Condé, 1951
 Protentomon barandiarani Condé, 1947
 Protentomon berlesei Nosek, 1969
 Protentomon fallax Condé, 1948
 Protentomon hellenicum Nosek, 1976
 Protentomon michiganense Bernard, 1975
 Protentomon milloti Condé, 1961
 Protentomon pauliani Condé, 1961
 Protentomon perpusillum Berlese, 1909
 Protentomon supernumerarium Tuxen, 1977
 Protentomon thienemanni Strenzke, 1942
 Protentomon transitans Ewing, 1921
 Protentomon tuxeni Nosek, 1966

References

Protura